Moisés López can refer to:

 Moisés López (cyclist) (born 1940), Mexican Olympic cyclist
 Moisés López (wrestler) (born 1941), Mexican Olympic wrestler
 Moisés Elías López (born 1989), Honduran footballer